Jules-Alexis Muenier (29 November 1863 – 17 December 1942) was a French painter and photographer.

Biography

In 1880, Jules-Alexis Muenier entered the École nationale supérieure des Beaux-Arts where he studied under Jean-Léon Gérôme, now considered one of the most important academic painters of his age. In the latter half of that same decade Muenier began exhibiting his work, first at the Paris Salon with the painting Le Bréviaire, which brought him much acclaim. In 1891, he exhibited The Catechism Lesson which brought recognition from the government, which eventually purchased his work.

Many of his works depict his native Haute-Saône, where he lived most of his life. He received the Chevalier de la Légion d'honneur in 1895 and became a member of Académie des Beaux-Arts in 1921. He was a close friend of fellow realist painter Pascal Dagnan-Bouveret.

Gallery

References

1863 births
1942 deaths
People from Vesoul
19th-century French painters
French male painters
20th-century French painters
20th-century French male artists
Members of the Académie des beaux-arts
19th-century French male artists